The 1988 Labatt Brier was held from March 6 to 13 at the Centre Georges-Vézina in Chicoutimi, Quebec.

Pat Ryan of Alberta finished the round robin with an undefeated record and went on to defeat Eugene Hritzuk of Saskatchewan in the final to clinch his first Brier title.

Teams

Round-robin standings

Round-robin results

Draw 1

Draw 2

Draw 3

Draw 4

Draw 5

Draw 6

Draw 7

Draw 8

Draw 9

Draw 10

Draw 11

Draw 12

Draw 13

Draw 14

Draw 15

Playoffs

Semifinal

Final

Statistics

Top 5 player percentages
Round Robin only

Team percentages
Round Robin only

References

The Brier
1988 in Canadian curling
Labatt Brier
Sport in Saguenay, Quebec
1988 in Quebec
March 1988 sports events in Canada